Nagambie Football Club is an Australian rules football club, established in 1897. The club is based in the North Eastern Victorian town of Nagambie.

The club is known as "The Lakers" and wear red, white and black panels similar to the Saints guernsey. Their most recent premiership success was in the 2019 season against Tallygaroopna.

Premierships
North East Football Association
1907, 1908
Waranga North East Football Association
1919, 1938
Goulburn Valley Football League
1939, 1946, 1947
Kyabram District Football League
1965, 1967, 1969, 1970, 1975, 1977, 1998, 2010, 2014, 2016, 2017, 2019

References

External links
Official site

Kyabram & District Football League clubs
1897 establishments in Australia
Australian rules football clubs established in 1897
Goulburn Valley Football League clubs